Thomas Hannifan (born May 19, 1989) is an American professional wrestling commentator and sports broadcaster. He is signed to Impact Wrestling as their lead play-by-play commentator. He previously was an announcer for WWE, under the ring name Tom Phillips, serving at various points as the play-by-play commentator on NXT, SmackDown, 205 Live, NXT UK and Raw. In 2022, Hannifan joined Impact Wrestling as their lead commentator.

Career

Early broadcasting career 
Hannifan's first broadcasting experience was as a public address announcer for a football game in his sophomore year of high school, where he also played backgammon and track and field. It was then he immediately knew he wanted to be in sports broadcasting. His quest to perfect his craft took him to Penn State Altoona and then Penn State main campus, majoring in broadcast journalism with an emphasis on sports broadcasting. During his time in Happy Valley, Hannifan was actively involved in COMRadio, the student-run radio station at Penn State.

After working with Big Ten Network's Student U branch and graduating from Penn State, Hannifan did play-by-play for Juniata College's football and basketball teams in central Pennsylvania for $50 a game. While doing that in the summer of 2012, he was waiting tables to stay afloat financially. After a year and a half out of school, Hannifan was wondering if broadcasting was a right fit for him, when he received a job offer from WWE.

WWE (2012–2021) 
Hannifan conducted backstage interviews for the WWE App on Raw and was the lead announcer on Superstars, Main Event and SmackDown, flanked by color commentators Jerry Lawler and Byron Saxton, until he was replaced by NXT'''s play-by-play commentator Rich Brennan on the August 27, 2015 episode of SmackDown. He also served as the Social Media Lounge host on all WWE pay-per-view pre-shows, until Fastlane (2017) when Charly Caruso took the Social Media Lounge, and also conducts backstage interviews for WWE.com.

In the summer of 2014, Phillips entered into a brief storyline with Alicia Fox, where he was stalked and tormented by her on a number of occasions, ringside and backstage. Hannifan, as Tom Phillips, served as lead play-by-play announcer for SmackDown Live commentary team. He was the lead commentator for the NXT brand tapings and broadcasts since 2014 until being replaced by Mauro Ranallo in 2017. Phillips also acted as lead play-by-play announcer at WrestleMania 33 on April 2, 2017 for the SmackDown brand, becoming the fifth person in the company's history to act as the lead commentator at WrestleMania. Philips also led commentating in 205 Live before Vic Joseph replaced him.

Phillips filled in for Cole on the October 2, 2017 Raw so that Cole could attend the wedding of his son. On October 5, 2019, WWE announced that a new commentary team will be on NXT UK, including Phillips. On November 1, 2019, due to significant flight delays, Phillips filled in on commentary for Michael Cole and Corey Graves on SmackDown with other substitute announcers Renee Young, Aiden English on first hour, and Pat McAfee on second hour.

Phillips also acted as lead play-by-play announcer at the Royal Rumble on January 26, 2020 for the Raw brand, then the next day, Phillips announced that he would return for his new play-on-play commentator role on Raw, replacing Vic Joseph joining the Raw commentary team alongside Jerry Lawler and Byron Saxton. On March 12, 2020, Phillips left the announcing team on NXT UK. In April 2021, it was announced that Phillips would be replaced  by Adnan Virk in his role as play-by-play commentator for Monday Night RAW. On May 27, 2021, WWE announced they had released Phillips from his contract, ending his nearly nine-year tenure with the company. 

In January 2022, Phillips revealed his reaction to his WWE release by stating “It was a shock and it was a surprise. It was an emotional and heart-breaking day, but this is a business, it's budget cuts, and the pandemic has hit a lot of different businesses in a lot of different ways. I kind of understood how things were going, Adnan Virk was brought in in April, then they made the move to Jimmy Smith. I saw the way that things were going but that’s just business. It took me a while to separate my personal feelings from what happened to a business standpoint".

Impact Wrestling (2022–present)
On January 8, 2022, Renee Paquette reported that Hannifan had joined Impact Wrestling as the new play-by-play announcer, replacing Matt Striker. Hannifan made his debut with the promotion at Hard to Kill.

 Other media 
Hannifan is currently the co-host of  PAYDIRT: A PENN STATE FOOTBALL SHOW, along with former Penn State and Oakland Raider Quarterback Matt McGloin.

Hannifan was also the host of one of WWE's most popular YouTube series, 5 Things'', until October 21, 2015, when Kyle Edwards replaced him. Phillips resumed the position in 2016 after Edwards was released from WWE.

References

External links 
 
 
 

1989 births
Living people
Professional wrestling announcers
Television personalities from Philadelphia
Donald P. Bellisario College of Communications alumni